The Return of Tal Farlow is an album by American jazz guitarist Tal Farlow, released in 1969.

Track listing
"Straight, No Chaser" (Thelonious Monk) – 6:24
"Darn That Dream" (Eddie DeLange, Jimmy Van Heusen) – 4:25
"Summertime" (George Gershwin, Ira Gershwin, DuBose Heyward) – 5:38
"Sometime Ago" (Sergio Mihanovich) – 4:01
"I'll Remember April" (Gene de Paul, Patricia Johnston, Don Raye) – 7:32
"My Romance" (Richard Rodgers, Lorenz Hart) – 6:00
"Crazy She Calls Me" (Bob Russell, Carl Sigman) – 7:43

Personnel
Tal Farlow – guitar
John Scully – piano
Jack Six – bass
Alan Dawson – drums
Production notes:
Don Schlitten – producer
Danfort Griffith– engineer

References

Tal Farlow albums
1969 albums
Prestige Records albums